The Rembrandt Research Project (RRP) was an initiative of the Nederlandse Organisatie voor Wetenschappelijk Onderzoek (NWO), which is the Netherlands Organization for Scientific Research. Its purpose was to organize and categorize research on Rembrandt van Rijn, with the aim of discovering new facts about this Dutch Golden Age painter and his studio. The project started in 1968 and was sponsored by NWO until 1998. Research continued until 2014. It was the authority on Rembrandt and had the final say in whether a painting is genuine. The documentation generated by the project was transferred to the Netherlands Institute for Art History and renamed the Rembrandt Database.

Results
As a result of the project, which analyzed documentation, techniques, and forensic research on Rembrandt paintings from his early years in Leiden until his death, the number of signed Rembrandt self-portraits around the world has been reduced by half. Also, more paintings have been attributed to students working in the Rembrandt studio, and more has been discovered about the ways in which the students worked. Recently, period copies of Rembrandt paintings are being studied for clues as to whether certain copies were factory-style pieces for visiting functionaries. Rembrandt's work was in high demand for decades, and he managed to keep productivity up while also keeping his prices high by enforcing strict quality control on the work done in his studio.

The project's six-volume publication, A Corpus of Rembrandt Paintings, is considered the definitive authority by all auction houses and dealers who work with works by Rembrandt and his studio. The research project has proved invaluable to art historians, and the lack of such a project for other prominent Dutch painters such as Frans Hals is felt sorely by museums and collectors trying to acquire the same sort of stamp of approval on their paintings.  However, the project has also initiated debate about the feasibility of conclusive attribution, particularly for painters who were associated with one or more workshops.

Publications 
 A Corpus of Rembrandt Paintings, various writers, in six volumes:
 Volume I, 1629-1631, 1982 (over early years in Leiden)
 Volume II, 1621-1634, 1986
 Volume III, 1635-1642, 1989
 Volume IV, E. van de Wetering (editor), Self-Portraits, 2005
 Volume V, E. van de Wetering (editor), The Small-Scale History Paintings, 2010
 Volume VI, E. van de Wetering (editor), Rembrandt’s Paintings Revisited, A Complete Survey, 2014
 Ernst van de Wetering, Rembrandt: The Painter at Work, Amsterdam University Press, 2009, .
 Ernst van de Wetering, Barbara de Lange, Rembrandt in Nieuw Licht, Local World, Amsterdam, 2009, .

Concordance with other Rembrandt catalogs
The research project is also the single point of reference regarding concordance with other catalogs of the master's works, though most of these reference each other, as well. Below is a partial list of some commonly quoted catalogs:
 Catalogue extracted from the Register L R. fol. 29 to 39 inclusive, of the Inventory of the Effects of Rembrandt Van Rhyn, deposited in the Office of the Administration of Insolvent Estates at Amsterdam, 1656 (published in English by Smith, 1836)
 Beredeneerde catalogus der werken van Rembrandt van Rhyn, en van zyne leerlingen en navolgers, herkomende uit het kabinet van wylen den heer C. Ploos van Amstel, J.Cz., welke in het openbaar zullen verkogt worden (Sale catalog of works sold from the collection of Cornelis Ploos van Amstel on Tuesday 31 July 1810), C. Josi, Amsterdam 1810
 A catalogue raisonné of the works of the most eminent Dutch, Flemish, and French painters : in which is included a short biographical notice of the artists, with a copious description of their principal pictures; a statement of the prices at which such pictures have been sold at public sales on the continent and in England; a reference to the galleries and private collections, in which a large portion are at present; and the names of the artists by whom they have been engraved; to which is added, a brief notice of the scholars & imitators of the great masters of the above schools, Volume 7 on "Rembrandt van Rhyn", by Smith, John, dealer in pictures, 1836
 Rembrandt, 8 volumes, by Wilhelm von Bode with Cornelis Hofstede de Groot, 1897–1905
 Rembrandt : des Meisters Gemälde in 643 Abbildungen, by Wilhelm Reinhold Valentiner and Adolf Rosenberg, 1908
 Beschreibendes kritisches Verzeichnis der Werke der hervorragendsten Holländischen Mahler des XVII. Jahrhunderts (1907-1928), Volume 6 Rembrandt, by Hofstede de Groot, 1914
 Rembrandt Paintings, by Abraham Bredius, 1935
 Rembrandt : Gemälde, by Kurt Bauch, 1966
 Rembrandt, by Bob Haak, 1968
 Rembrandt, by Horst Gerson, 1968
 Rembrandt : the complete edition of the paintings, a reworking of the Bredius 1935 list by Gerson with explicitly rejected attributions and re-attributions, 1969
 L' opera pittorica completa di Rembrandt, by Paolo Lecaldano, 1969
 Rembrandt, by Christian Tümpel, 1986
 Rembrandt : catalogo completo dei dipinti, by Leonard J. Slatkes, 1992
 The Rembrandt Book, by Gary Schwarz, 2006

Old man with turban
In 1998, the pAn Amsterdam art fair showed a Rembrandt for the first time that until then had been attributed to his pupil Jacques des Rousseaux. This painting was first cataloged in 1917 by Abraham Bredius, who accepted it as a Rembrandt. Later Kurt Bauch rejected this based on a photograph and attributed it to Jan Lievens without ever having seen the painting. Werner Sumowski re-attributed the painting based on photographs to Rousseaux as a rebuttal to the arguments by art historians Bauch, Jakob Rosenberg and Horst Gerson. The Rembrandt Research project seeks to avoid such arguments by making attributions based on historical and forensic evidence. The study of Rembrandt's oevre includes study of drawings and etchings as well as paintings by a wide range of artists who were Rembrandt's contemporaries. Analysis of his techniques includes the study of paints and panel wood he and his contemporaries used, while x-rays of paintings reveal whether a painting is a copy based on the amount of "discovery" drawing in the underlayer.

The pAn 1998 catalog contains an article by Ernst van de Wetering with photos of other depictions of the same man by Jan Lievens, Gerard Dou, and Jacques Rousseau (thus the mis-attribution). The man has clearly the same face in all four portraits.

Rembrandt's father
According to Van de Wetering, this is the man often referred to as Rembrandt's father, who was probably not his father, but a functionary in the Leiden painters' guild or male model.

End
In early 2011, the RRP board voted to terminate the project by the end of 2011 even though approximately one-quarter of Rembrandt's oeuvre has not yet been investigated.  A major reason for this decision was the lack of scholars available to assume responsibilities from the RRP's chair, Ernst van de Wetering, who has been involved with the project since 1968.  Other reasons cited included lack of funding, as the Netherlands Organisation for Scientific Research ceased funding the project in 1998.  However, with funding from the Mellon Foundation, the Netherlands Institute for Art History and the Mauritshuis have launched a pilot initiative called the Rembrandt Database that will build off of and supplement research from the RRP.

See also
Ernst van de Wetering, chair of the Rembrandt Research Project
Bob Haak, founder of the Rembrandt Research Project
John Smith, wrote the first catalog raisonné of Rembrandt paintings in 1836
Hofstede de Groot, wrote a comprehensive update of Smith's catalog in 1914
Abraham Bredius, wrote his first catalog of Rembrandt paintings in 1935
Horst Gerson, first wrote his own catalog in 1968, followed by the first revision of Bredius's catalog in 1969
Christian Tümpel, wrote a comprehensive update of Gerson's catalog in 1986
List of paintings by Rembrandt, based on the 2014 (final?) list of the RRP published in A Corpus of Rembrandt Paintings, Volume VI
List of Rembrandt pupils

References

Bibliography
 A Corpus of Rembrandt Paintings IV: The Self-Portraits (Rembrandt Research Project Foundation), Ernst van de Wetering, 2005

External links

Ernst van de Wetering in Google books

Art history
Research institutes in the Netherlands